Abbotsdale is a settlement in West Coast District Municipality Swartland Municipality in the Western Cape province of South Africa.

Here in around 1854 the Abbotsdale Mission was founded  on a 1600 acre farm purchased by Bishop Gray of the Anglican Church.

References

Populated places in the Swartland Local Municipality